Agdistis adenensis is a moth in the family Pterophoridae. It is known from Yemen, Oman, Iran and Bahrain.

References

Agdistinae
Moths of the Arabian Peninsula
Moths of the Middle East
Taxa named by Hans Georg Amsel
Moths described in 1961